Ligota - Panewniki (also "Idaweiche") is a district of Katowice in Poland. It has an area of 12.59 km2 and in 2007 had 31,879 inhabitants.

Ligota-Panewniki is famous due to the magnificent Franciscan Basilica, the headquarters of the Franciscan Assumption Province in Poland. During Christmas the church becomes a religious and tourist attraction due to its Christmas Nativity scene, which supposedly is the biggest in Europe.

In September 1939, Panewniki was one of the sites of large massacres of Polish defenders of Katowice, carried out by the Germans following the invasion of Poland, which started World War II (see Nazi crimes against the Polish nation). During the subsequent German occupation, the occupiers operated two forced labour camps in Ligota: one for Poles (Polenlager), and one for Jews.

Famous people
 Jerzy Kukuczka

Gallery

References

Districts of Katowice
Nazi war crimes in Poland